The Kuhn Station Site is the site of an archaeological dig on Silver Creek, near Edwardsville, Illinois. The site is roughly .3 hectares in area, and was home to a small village. The site is believed to be from the Mississippian period, but archaeologists also found artifacts dating from the Moorehead/Sand Prairie period, such as ceramics. As well, the village had an earthen embankment surrounding its perimeter, and a low platform mound.

See also
List of archaeological sites on the National Register of Historic Places in Illinois

References

Sources
 Emerson, Thomas E., Lewis, R. Barry (1999). Cahokia and the Hinterlands, University of Illinois Press.

Middle Mississippian culture
Archaeological sites on the National Register of Historic Places in Illinois
Geography of Madison County, Illinois
National Register of Historic Places in Madison County, Illinois
Mounds in Illinois